The Wind is a 1926 Soviet silent romantic drama directed by Cheslav Sabinsky and Lev Sheffer.

Cast
 Nikolai Saltykov as Vasilii Guliavin - Army officer  
 Oksana Podlesnaya as Lelka the bandit queen  
 Natasha Sokolova as Annushka  
 Evgenii Nadelin as Mikhail Stroev - Red Army commissar 
 Aleksandr Antonov as Sailor 
 N. Bobrov as Artillery commander  
 Aleksandr Timontayev as Sailor  
 Vladimir Uralsky as Sailor

References

Bibliography 
 Christie, Ian & Taylor, Richard. The Film Factory: Russian and Soviet Cinema in Documents 1896-1939. Routledge, 2012.

External links 
 

1926 films
1926 romantic drama films
Soviet romantic drama films
Russian romantic drama films
Soviet silent feature films
1920s Russian-language films
Soviet black-and-white films
Russian black-and-white films
Russian silent feature films
Silent romantic drama films